East Side Presbyterian Church, now known as Parsells Avenue Community Church, is a historic Presbyterian church located in the Beechwood neighborhood of Rochester, Monroe County, New York.  The church was built in 1925-1925 and is a large rectangular brick building with cast stone trim in the Romanesque Revival style.  The church features a tall engaged square tower with an octagonal cupola at its northwest corner.  Attached to the church is a two-story education wing constructed between 1909 and 1911.  It housed the original church and is also in the Romanesque Revival style.

The church was listed on the National Register of Historic Places in 2010.

Gallery

References

External links
Parsells Avenue Community Church website

Churches on the National Register of Historic Places in New York (state)
Romanesque Revival church buildings in New York (state)
Churches completed in 1911
20th-century Presbyterian church buildings in the United States
Churches in Rochester, New York
Presbyterian churches in New York (state)
National Register of Historic Places in Rochester, New York
1911 establishments in New York (state)